Philadelphia Stock Exchange (PHLX), now known as Nasdaq PHLX, is the first stock exchange established in the United States and the oldest stock exchange in the nation. The exchange is owned by Nasdaq, which acquired it in 2007 for $652 million, and is headquartered in Philadelphia. 

The exchange was founded in 1790 and originally named the Board of Brokers of Philadelphia and sometimes referred to as the Philadelphia Board of Brokers. In 1875, the Board of Brokers changed its name to the Philadelphia Stock Exchange.

In 1949, the exchange merged with the Baltimore Stock Exchange and was renamed the Philadelphia-Baltimore Stock Exchange. In 1954, it merged with the Washington Stock Exchange and was renamed the Philadelphia-Baltimore-Washington Stock Exchange, often abbreviated PBW. In 1969, the exchange acquired the Pittsburgh Stock Exchange.

History

1790–1875: Board of Brokers
Over its more than 200 years in existence, the Philadelphia Stock Exchange has had various titles and has been located in various buildings around Philadelphia. Founded in 1790 as the "Board of Brokers," it was located at the Merchants Coffee House, now known as the City Tavern, at the corner of Second and Walnut Streets.

In 1831, Stephen Girard’s Bank had formed the "Philadelphia Merchant’s Exchange Company" to erect a new building to house the Board of Brokers and other groups.  The Board of Brokers moved into the Merchants Exchange Building at 3rd and Dock Streets in 1834 following a fire at the coffee house.

On June 20, 1857, the Board of Brokers of Philadelphia transacted no business in the stock board, as their annual dinner was held that day.

As of January 1, 1874, the par price for membership in the Philadelphia Board of Brokers was $1,000, with 198 seats, and "not others are attainable under $2,000 each." The board represented a market capital of around $350,000.

1875–1949: Philadelphia Stock Exchange
In 1875, the Board of Brokers changed its name to the Philadelphia Stock Exchange.

In 1876, the exchange moved to the rear of the Girard Bank Building, formerly the First Bank of the United States. It stayed there until 1888. From 1888 to 1902, the exchange moved to the Drexel Building which was located near Fifth Street and Chestnut. Between 1902 and 1912, the exchange returned to the Merchants Exchange Building. In 1913, it moved to a building at 1411 Walnut Street, now listed on the National Register of Historic Places.

In 1951, the exchange moved to the Central Penn Bank Building at 1401 Walnut Street. It stayed there until 1966 when it moved to a newly constructed building (currently the Sofitel Hotel) at 17th and Sansom. The 1700 block of Ionic Street, a narrow thoroughfare just north of this building, was renamed Stock Exchange Place and was still signed as such as of 2017.

In December 1968, in response to a fiscal crisis, Philadelphia imposed a $0.05 per share stock transfer tax for all transactions on the PHLX.  On January 2, 1969, the PHLX moved its trading floor to an office building, then known as the Decker Building, just across a street from the city boundaries in Bala Cynwyd to avoid the tax.  In February, a court ruled that the tax was illegal, and the PHLX moved its trading floor back to its headquarters in the city.

In 1981, the exchange moved to 19th and Market, where it stayed until 2017 when it moved to its current location in the newly built FMC Tower.

1949–present: Mergers
The exchange merged with the Baltimore Stock Exchange in 1949. The exchange was then named the Philadelphia-Baltimore Stock Exchange. The Baltimore Stock Exchange then migrated out of its Baltimore Stock Exchange Building, later renamed the Totman Building, to a new home base in Philadelphia.

The exchange merged with the Washington Stock Exchange in 1954. The exchange was known as the Philadelphia-Baltimore-Washington Stock Exchange (often abbreviated as PBW) after those mergers. In 1969, the exchange acquired the Pittsburgh Stock Exchange, and maintained an auxiliary trading floor in Pittsburgh until 1974.

On October 22, 1981, trading was halted on both the Chicago Board of Trade and the Philadelphia Stock Exchange after anonymous callers said bombs had been placed in those buildings.

In 2005, a number of large financial firms purchased stakes in the exchange as a hedge against growing consolidation of stock trading by the New York Stock Exchange and Nasdaq. These firms—Morgan Stanley, Citigroup, Credit Suisse First Boston, UBS, Merrill Lynch and Citadel LLC—collectively owned about 89% of the exchange.

On October 20, 2007, The Wall Street Journal reported that the exchange was for sale by a group of its shareholders, and was expected to be sold for about $600 million.

On November 7, 2007, NASDAQ announced a "definitive agreement" to purchase PHLX for $652 million, with the transaction expected to close in early 2008. On July 24, 2008, the acquisition was completed, creating the third-largest options market in the U.S.

On October 29, 2012, the stock exchange was shut down for two days due to Hurricane Sandy. The last time the stock exchange was closed due to weather for a full two days was on March 12 and 13, 1888.

As of 2014, the exchange handles trades for approximately 3,600 equity options, 15 index options, and a number of FX options. The PHLX has more than 16% of United States market share in exchange-listed stock and ETF options trading.

In March 2020, the PHLX announced plans to temporarily move to all-electronic trading on March 23, 2020, due to the COVID-19 pandemic. Along with the NYSE and the BSE, the PHLX reopened on May 26, 2020.

Locations
1790-1834 – Merchants Coffee House (City Tavern), 138 South 2nd Street at Walnut Street
1834-1876 – Merchants' Exchange Building, 143 South 3rd Streets at Dock Street
1876-1888 – Girard Bank Building, 120 South 3rd Street, between Walnut and Chestnut Streets
1888-1902 – Drexel Building, near Chestnut and South 5th Streets
1902-1912 – Merchants' Exchange Building, 143 South 3rd Streets at Dock Street
1913-1951 – 1411 Walnut Street, between South Broad and South 15th Streets
1951-1966 – Central Penn Bank Building, 1401 Walnut Street, between South Broad and South 15th Streets
1966-1981 – 120 South 17th Street, between Sansom Street and Stock Exchange Place (Ionic Street)
Jan-Feb 1969 – Drecker Building, Bala Cynwyd, Pennsylvania (trading floor only)
1981-2017 – Market and South 19th Streets
2017-now – FMC Tower at Cira Centre South, 2929 Walnut Street, between Schuylkill Expressway and South 30th Street

Hours
The exchange's normal trading sessions are from 9:30 am to 4:00 pm on all days of the week except Saturdays, Sundays and holidays declared by the exchange in advance.

See also

Merchants' Exchange Building
Philadelphia Bourse 
 List of stock exchanges
 List of stock exchanges in the Americas 
List of stock exchange mergers in the Americas

References
Notes

Further reading
 Vitiello, Domenic with Thomas, George E. (2010) The Philadelphia Stock Exchange and the City It Made Philadelphia: University of Pennsylvania Press.
 Walsh, Thomas J.review of The Philadelphia Stock Exchange and the City It Made Philadelphia: University of Pennsylvania Press. PlanPhilly.com

External links

Official website
"Philadelphia Stock Exchange Papers", The Historical Society of Pennsylvania, documenting the history and activities of the exchange from 1746 to 2005

1790 establishments in Pennsylvania
Buildings and structures on the National Register of Historic Places in Philadelphia
Economy of Philadelphia
Financial services companies established in 1790
Horace Trumbauer buildings
Nasdaq, Inc.
Options exchanges in the United States
Organizations based in Philadelphia
Rittenhouse Square, Philadelphia
Self-regulatory organizations in the United States
Stock exchanges in the United States